Augusta Emma Wilde, Baroness Truro (née d'Este; 11 August 1801 – 21 May 1866) was the daughter of Prince Augustus Frederick, Duke of Sussex, by his marriage with Lady Augusta Murray, second daughter of John Murray, 4th Earl of Dunmore, and Lady Charlotte Stewart.

Peerage

Her parents were married in Rome and afterwards at St George's, Hanover Square. Following their father's death, Augusta's brother Augustus d’Este claimed the dukedom; but the House of Lords decided against the claim, on the grounds of the invalidity of the prince's marriage, it having been contracted without the consent of the Crown, as required by the Royal Marriages Act 1772.

In 1845, when she was 44 years old, she married as his second wife, Sir Thomas Wilde, later Baron Truro (7 July 1782 – 11 November 1855). Although Lord Truro had three surviving children by his first marriage, they had no children.

Later life
Lady Truro had strong connections with Ramsgate, Kent, residing at Mount Albion House on the East Cliff. She owned a considerable amount of valuable property, mainly situated on the Mount Albion Estate.

In later years, Lady Truro suffered from severe bouts of asthma and usually spent the autumn on the continent. She returned to her town residence in Eaton Square, London, where she died suddenly on 21 May 1866, eleven years after her husband. The Thanet Advertiser remembered her as: "a lady of strict business habits, and rather reserved in manner, of exceedingly good general information, living, while at Ramsgate, in a very quiet and unostentatious way”.

The funeral took place on the afternoon of Monday 28 May 1866 at St Laurence Church, Ramsgate. She is interred in the family mausoleum (Grade II listed). She left an estate valued at around £70,000, of which over £40,000 was left to charity.

External links

References

1801 births
1866 deaths
Truro
Augusta Emma D'Este
Daughters of British dukes
Illegitimate children of British princes
People from Folkestone